The 2005 PGA Argentina Tour was a season of golf tournaments on the PGA of Argentina Tour, the official professional golf tour of Argentina. The season ran from the end of January to the beginning of December, and consisted of sixteen tournaments.

The Order of Merit was won by Ángel Cabrera, ahead of Julio Zapata in second, and Andrés Romero in third.

Three events were co-sanctioned by the Tour de las Americas, the highest level tour in Latin America, with the Argentine Open also being co-sanctioned by the Challenge Tour.

Schedule of tournaments

External links
http://www.pgargentina.org.ar – official site

Golf in Argentina
Argentina